The Girl in the Fog is a 2017 Italian psychological thriller film based on the novel of the same name by Donato Carrisi.

Plot
The Girl in the Fog is a psychological thriller. It draws one into the world of its characters to question his own moral assumptions.

A 16 year old girl goes missing in an isolated region and suddenly the males of the small village are under scrutiny. 

The policeman in charge of the investigation has a track record of not letting innocence get in the way of a solid arrest, especially when the public and the media are baying for a result.

The detective's old adversary in the form of a righteous female journalist appears, just  to pile on the pressure.

A popular and  respected local high school teacher becomes the focus of his interest and a cat and mouse game ensues.  

But is the teacher really innocent - and a serial killer on the loose?

Cast
Toni Servillo as Agent Vogel
Alessio Boni as  Prof. Loris Martini
Jean Reno as  Dr. Augusto Flores
Lorenzo Richelmy as  Agent Borghi
Galatea Ranzi as  Stella Honer
Michela Cescon as  Agent Mayer
 as  Clea
 as  Maria Kastner
 as  Mattia
Greta Scacchi as Beatrice Lehman
Ekaterina Buscemi as Anna Lu

Reception

Awards
David di Donatello — Best New Director (Migliore Regista Esordiente) Donato Carrisi

References

External links

2017 crime thriller films
Italian crime thriller films
2017 directorial debut films
Films based on Italian novels
Poliziotteschi films
Films about police officers
Italian psychological thriller films
2017 psychological thriller films
Films set in the Alps
Films set in Italy
Rainbow S.r.l. films
2010s Italian films
2010s Italian-language films